Saint-Just-la-Pendue is a commune in the Loire department in central France.

Name
The name of the commune dates from the 11th century and is recorded in the documents of Savigny Abbey, Rhône. The qualifying name la Pendue stems from an oral tradition of a woman hanged for adultery, who, after four days, fell to the ground alive, a proof of her innocence. Supposedly the location of the execution, a local wood also bears the name la Pendue.

Population

Personalities
Georges Guillard, organist and musicologist
Jean Dupuis, trader and explorer

See also
Communes of the Loire department

References

Communes of Loire (department)
Loire communes articles needing translation from French Wikipedia